The House of Moana is a princely line of the Islands of Hawaii. The line begins with Moana kāne (sometimes Moanakāne), the son of the former alii nui of the island, Keākealani Kāne and is also the name of the ruler's granddaughter. Moana kāne and Moana Wahine's descendants include many, if not most of the monarchs from the House of Kamehameha. In the Hawaiian language "moana" means: "ocean". The word combines moe and ana (a lying down) and can also mean the act of prostrating one's self by leaning forward on one's hands and knees in the presence of a chief. Also meaning the act of worship. Ku-hai-moana is the most famous of the Hawaiian shark gods.

Origins of the House of Moana
Moana (k) is directly descended from the notable aliʻi ʻaimoku (noble ruling a district or districts) named Liloa through both of the high chief's two sons. Kaleiheana is descended from Liloa's first born son Hakau and from Liloa's grandson Keawenuiaumi is descended Keākealani Kāne. Kaleiheana is a step sister of Alapainui. The couple's son would be referred to similarly as his father with the addition of the word or title kāne, meaning: male or husband and is also the name of the leading Hawaiian god. Moana Kāne married Piʻilaniwahine and from their union the chiefly lines of Piʻilani and the full Liloa/Umi/Hakau lines are merged. The couple had three children, ʻIlikiāmoana, Lonoamoana and Kapuniamoana.

ʻIlikiāmoana (w) would marry Kauhiapiiao (k) and from their union would come the high priestess Moanawahine. She would become the most sought after woman of her time to father the children of future kings from numerous high chiefs. Much of the Hawaiian Royal Family are directly related to this line, including many of the monarchs of the Kingdom of Hawaii from the House of Kamehameha. Moana (k) represents the beginning of a new kaukau aliʻi service line of Hawaiian nobility up to Kanaʻina. As a secondary aliI family line, members would often marry into the ruling family. She is the great grandmother of Lunalilo and great, great grandmother of Kamehameha IV, Kamehameha V, Keʻelikōlani and a more distant great, great, great grandmother of Bernice Pauahi Bishop. The genealogy books of Queen Kalama, Book C on page 2, lists Moana (w) as cohabitating with Keaweʻopala as entered in her own handwriting. ʻIlikiāmoana and Kauhiapiiao would also have other children named: Kahanaumalani, Heiaholani, and Ko'iali'ipuhe'elani.

Moana Kāne
ʻIlikiāmoana
Lonoamoana
Kapuniamoana
Moana Wahine

Family tree of Kamehameha and Moana

Citations

References
 
 
 
 

Hawaiian nobility
Royalty of the Hawaiian Kingdom
House of Līloa